The Atlantic Coast Conference (ACC) Men's Basketball Rookie of the Year is an award given to the freshman basketball player in the Atlantic Coast Conference voted by members of the Atlantic Coast Sports Media Association as the most outstanding freshman player.

Winners

Winners by school

See also 
Atlantic Coast Conference Men's Basketball Player of the Year
List of All-Atlantic Coast Conference men's basketball teams

References

External links 
2008-09 ACC Men's Basketball Media Guide Click on the link "Pages 83-112" to access the Rookie of the Year information.
Duke Update: ACC Rookie of the Year

ACC
Rookie
Awards established in 1976
College sports freshman awards